The 2015–16 UNC Asheville Bulldogs men's basketball team represented the University of North Carolina at Asheville during the 2015–16 NCAA Division I men's basketball season. The Bulldogs, led by third year head coach Nick McDevitt, played their home games at Kimmel Arena and were members of the Big South Conference. They finished the season 22–12, 12–6 in Big South play to finish in a tie for third place. They defeated Liberty, High Point, and Winthrop to become champions Big South tournament and received the conference's automatic bid to the NCAA tournament where they were eliminated in the first round by Villanova.

Previous season 
The Bulldogs finished the 2014–15 season 15–16, 10–8 in Big South play to finish in sixth place. They lost to Coastal Carolina in the quarterfinals of the Big South tournament.

Roster

Schedule

|-
!colspan=9 style="background:#00438C; color:#FFFFFF;"| Exhibition

|-
!colspan=9 style="background:#00438C; color:#FFFFFF;"| Regular season

|-
!colspan=9 style="background:#00438C; color:#FFFFFF;"| Big South tournament

|-
!colspan=9 style="background:#00438C; color:#FFFFFF;"| NCAA tournament

References

UNC Asheville Bulldogs men's basketball seasons
UNC Asheville
UNC Asheville
Asheville
Asheville